The Cathedral of Our Lady of the Angels, informally known as COLA or the Los Angeles Cathedral, is a cathedral of the Roman Catholic Church in Los Angeles, California, United States. It opened in 2002 and serves as the mother church for the Archdiocese of Los Angeles, as well as the seat of Archbishop José Horacio Gómez.

The structure replaced the Cathedral of Saint Vibiana, which was severely damaged in the 1994 Northridge earthquake. Under Roger Cardinal Mahony, Archbishop of Los Angeles, Our Lady of the Angels was begun in 1998 and formally dedicated on September 2, 2002. There was considerable controversy over both its deconstructivist and modern design, costs incurred in its construction and furnishing, and the archdiocese's decision to build a crypt under the cathedral.

The cathedral is named in honor of the Virgin Mary under the patronal title of "Our Lady of the Angels", echoing the full name of the original settlement of Los Angeles (or "The Town of Our Lady the Queen of the Angels"). The cathedral is widely known for enshrining the relics of Saint Vibiana and tilma piece of Our Lady of Guadalupe. It is the mother church to approximately five million professed Catholics in the archdiocese.

History

The Cathedral of Saint Vibiana had served as the cathedral of the Los Angeles see since its completion in 1876. Soon after its completion, the diocese noted it to be of inferior construction quality and also too small for Los Angeles' rapidly growing population. In 1904, Bishop Thomas James Conaty gained permission from the Holy See to build a new cathedral to be named after Our Lady of the Angels.  However, an economic downturn in 1907 put a stop to the project; a Catholic parish church was later built on the site. In the 1940s, plans were drawn up for a new cathedral on Wilshire Boulevard that would seat 3,000 people, and in 1945 Archbishop John Joseph Cantwell announced that the Holy See approved the name "Cathedral of Our Lady of the Angels". That cathedral was never built, however, as Cantwell died in 1947 and his successor, James Francis McIntyre, decided instead that building new parish churches and schools in the expanding metropolis was a more pressing need for the archdiocese. McIntyre gained permission from donors to redirect money donated for the Cantwell cathedral fund to those needs.

The 1994 Northridge earthquake severely damaged the Cathedral of Saint Vibiana, which led the archdiocese to close the cathedral due to safety concerns. In January 1995 the archdiocese announced plans to build a new cathedral on the Saint Vibiana site, plans which necessitated the demolition of the old cathedral. This led to a lengthy legal battle between the archdiocese and preservationists, who argued that the cathedral was a city landmark and that it should be either incorporated into the new cathedral or otherwise saved. The archdiocese contended that restoring the old cathedral to carry out its functions safely would cost $18–20 million, and had not received any pledges or donations for this purpose.

This legal battle prompted the archdiocese to look to build the cathedral on a new site. In December 1996, the archdiocese announced it was purchasing a  site between Temple Street and the Hollywood Freeway from Los Angeles County at a cost of $10.85 million. The archdiocese chose to retain the "Cathedral of Our Lady of the Angels" name approved by the Vatican in the 1940s. The initially proposed budget for the project was $150 million,  rising to a final cost of $189.7 million. The construction was supervised by Father Richard S. Vosko, a liturgical design consultant and priest of the Diocese of Albany who has overseen the design and renovation of numerous churches and cathedrals in the United States. Construction began in 1998 and was completed in September 2002.

Design

The architect was Pritzker Prize-winning Spaniard Rafael Moneo.  Using elements of postmodern architecture, the church and the Cathedral Center feature a series of acute and obtuse angles while avoiding right angles.  Contemporary statuary and appointments decorate the complex.  Prominent of these appointments are the bronze doors and the statue called The Virgin Mary, all adorning the entrance and designed by Robert Graham. Other features include three fountains and a bronze sculpture by Johnny Bear Contreras dedicated as a Native American memorial. The building is equipped with solar panels for generating 15% of its electricity.

In addition to the church, the cathedral grounds also include a mausoleum, gift shop, cafe, children's garden, conference center, and clergy residences. The relics of Saint Vibiana are interred in the mausoleum, as are the remains of several past bishops, archbishops, and auxiliary bishops of Los Angeles.

Criticism

Roger Cardinal Mahony's decision to build a new cathedral utilizing contemporary architecture drew criticisms from those who preferred the gothic revival stylings typical of preceding centuries. In actuality, the cathedral's architectural design was selected from a pool of 38 submissions from international architectural firms as far away as Japan, Germany, Spain and England, by a blue-ribbon jury of experts from the J. Paul Getty Trust, California Institute of the Arts, UCLA, USC, Harvard and the American Academy in Rome.
 
Others argued that a church of that size and expense was unnecessary, overly-elaborate and that the money could have been better spent on social programs, suggesting that either St. Vincent Church on West Adams Boulevard or St. Basil Church on South Kingsley Drive, despite their smaller size, could perform the functions required of a cathedral with minimal additional cost. However, the original estimate of  $100 million in construction costs in 1995 by the cathedral's architect, Harvard Professor Rafael Moneo, seems modest under current-day standards, when compared with the construction costs for affordable housing units in California, which have risen to $480,000 to $600,000 per unit in 2019, often utilizing public subsidies of $30 million upwards per project. 

Cardinal Mahoney reiterated his pledge for no parish-based appeal to finance the cathedral construction, and urged major donors to the cathedral not to cut back on their current or future charitable giving in order to continue outreach efforts to the poor at the same time. To keep the record straight, a resume of the total construction costs was released to the press. Avoiding any fundraising from local parishes and devoting 24 hours per week in contacting actual and potential donors, the cardinal described his cathedral project in some of his letters as follows:
"Historically, cathedrals have defined their eras, creating a legacy of enduring and innovative architectural designs.  They have served as a focal point for artistic and religious expression through their acquisition from local artisans of the adornments that distinguish and enhance the structure, and through the central role they have played in preserving and expanding the spiritual and liturgical teachings that define the Catholic faith. . . . This project will serve a vital role in our society - contributing to the architectural, religious and cultural persona of downtown Los Angeles".

In response to protests staged during the construction of the cathedral, the cardinal's editorial for the Los Angeles Times, dated October 19, 1998, stated:
"The Catholic Worker and others shortchange the poor when they adopt the stance that the Church should be attentive only to the material concerns of the needy.  This is out of step with Church history and with the teaching of Jesus, who said that people do not live by bread alone.  There are various kinds of poverty, of which material poverty is but one."
Entities within the Archdiocese of Los Angeles, such as Catholic Charities, Together in Mission, and the Catholic Education Foundation, are responsible for funneling funds that help to feed, clothe, house, educate and provide healthcare for the poor.

Organ
The organ is opus 75 of Dobson Pipe Organ Builders of Lake City, Iowa, and is a 105 rank/ 4 manual instrument that incorporates pipes from the 1929 Wangerin organ of St. Vibiana's Cathedral. Dobson's Opus 75 has a total of 6,019 pipes. It is the 89th largest pipe organ in North America and the 143rd largest in the world. To meet earthquake-stability requirements, the pipes and case are supported by a massive internal steel frame.

Mausoleum

The cathedral features a mausoleum in its lower level, containing 1,270 crypts and 4,746 columbarium niches for burials. Proceeds from the sale of memorials and burial spaces are placed in an endowment fund to support the cathedral.

All past ordinaries of the archdiocese are memorialized in the mausoleum, including a future burial site for Cardinal Roger Mahony, and the remains of several ordinaries and auxiliary bishops who died before the cathedral was built were transferred there. The tomb of Saint Vibiana was transferred to the cathedral from its previous location above the altar at the Cathedral of Saint Vibiana; the tomb is the centerpiece of the St. Vibiana Chapel located adjacent to the mausoleum.

The crypt mausoleum features a number of stained glass windows that were originally installed in Saint Vibiana's Cathedral. This idea was suggested by Mario Agustin Locsin, a renowned Liturgical Artist and consultant on the renovation. The old cathedral windows were restored and two new windows featuring guardian angels created by the Judson Studios were placed at the entrance to the crypt mausoleum.

List of notable persons interred at the cathedral

Clergy
 Bishop Juan Alfredo Arzube
 Thaddeus Amat y Brusi, first Bishop of Los Angeles
 John Cantwell, first Archbishop of Los Angeles
 Bishop Thomas James Conaty
 Bishop Carl Anthony Fisher
 James Francis McIntyre, second Archbishop of Los Angeles, who was created cardinal
 John J. Ward, auxiliary bishop

Laity
 Bernardine Murphy Donohue, philanthropist and papal countess
 Daniel J. Donahue, philanthropist and papal gentleman
 Victor and Loretta Baron Mahony, parents of Cardinal Roger Mahony
 June Marlowe, actress
 Gregory Peck, actor
 Saint Vibiana, patron saint of the Archdiocese of Los Angeles

Events

On September 3, 2011, the cathedral played host to a Votive Mass in honor of the Blessed Virgin Mary. The Mass marked the conclusion of the First Annual Grand Marian Procession organised by the Queen of Angels Foundation.

The cathedral is a popular Catholic wedding venue on a year-round basis.

The cathedral hosts occasional musical performances, including concerts by Libera.

Every Wednesday afternoon, the cathedral holds an organ recital. It is free and open to the public.

Pastor History
Msgr. Kevin Kostelnik 2002-2017
Fr. David Gallardo 2017-2022
Msgr. Antonio Cacciapuoti 2022-

See also
List of Catholic cathedrals in the United States
List of cathedrals in the United States
Roman Catholic Marian churches

References

Further reading
 Bühren, Ralf van: Kunst und Kirche im 20. Jahrhundert. Die Rezeption des Zweiten Vatikanischen Konzils, Paderborn: Ferdinand Schöningh 2008, pp.  85–87, 609–610, ill.

External links

Roman Catholic Archdiocese of Los Angeles official website
Cathedrals of California
Photo gallery on Figure Ground
Documentary film about John Nava's tapestries

2000s architecture in the United States
2002 establishments in California
Buildings and structures in Downtown Los Angeles
Bunker Hill, Los Angeles
Cathedral
Downtown Los Angeles
Landmarks in Los Angeles
Mausoleums in the United States
Postmodern architecture in California
Rafael Moneo buildings
Christian organizations established in 2002
Roman Catholic Archdiocese of Los Angeles
Roman Catholic cathedrals in California
Roman Catholic churches completed in 2002
Roman Catholic churches in Los Angeles
21st-century Roman Catholic church buildings in the United States